Charles Henry Jones (March 7, 1848 – January 26, 1913) was an American journalist, editor, and political figure. Born in  Talbotton, Georgia, at age 15 he joined the Confederate Army during the Civil War. In 1866 he moved to New York, where he edited Eclectic Magazine and  Appleton's Journal.  He moved to Jacksonville, Florida, in 1881, where he established the Florida Daily Times, which incorporated rival Florida Union to become the Florida Times-Union. He later was editor of St. Louis Republic, St. Louis Dispatch (1895–97) and New York World (1893–95).  He was president of the National Editorial Association, and was prominent in the Democratic Party, leading the Florida Democratic Party and writing the Chicago Platform of 1896 and Kansas City Platform of 1900. He died in Ospedaletti, Italy.

References

External links

Guide to the Charles H. Jones Papers at the University of Florida

1848 births
1913 deaths
19th-century American newspaper editors
People from Talbotton, Georgia
People of Georgia (U.S. state) in the American Civil War
Editors of Florida newspapers
Editors of New York (state) newspapers
Journalists from Florida
Journalists from Missouri
Journalists from New York City
Confederate States Army soldiers
Florida Democrats